Juha Matti Pellervo Kankkunen (born 2 April 1959) is a Finnish former rally driver. His factory team career in the World Rally Championship lasted from 1983 to 2002. He won 23 world rallies and four drivers' world championship titles, which were both once records in the series. Both Sébastien Loeb and Sébastien Ogier have since collected more world titles, but no driver was able to repeat Kankkunen's feat of becoming a world champion with three different manufacturers until Ogier matched this achievement in 2020.

Kankkunen was signed by Toyota Team Europe in 1983 and he took his first WRC win in his third year in the team. His performances got him a deal with the defending champions Peugeot for 1986, and Kankkunen was soon crowned the series' then youngest-ever champion. As Peugeot withdrew from the championship following the ban of Group B, Kankkunen moved to Lancia and became the first driver to successfully defend his title. After a two-year stint back at Toyota, he returned to Lancia and won a record third title in 1991.

In 1993, Kankkunen re-joined Toyota and won his fourth title. Following Toyota's disqualification and 12-month ban in 1995, Kankkunen did not return to active participation in the series until joining Ford halfway through the 1997 season replacing an underperforming Armin Schwarz. After moving to Subaru for 1999, he took his first win in over five years. Before retiring after the 2002 season, he competed part-time for Hyundai.

Kankkunen's achievements outside the WRC include winning the Dakar Rally in 1988 and the Race of Champions in 1988 and 1991. Following his retirement from active rallying, he has worked in the fields of business and politics. In 2007, Kankkunen set the world speed record on ice in a Bentley Continental GT. In 2011, he set a further record of 330.695 km/h in a convertible Bentley Continental Supersports.

Career
Kankkunen grew up on his family's farm in Laukaa in Central Finland, near the route of the Rally Finland. His father had rallying and ice racing as a hobby, and taught Juha how to drive on an ice racing track. Kankkunen began to drive when he was seven years old, and owned his first car at the age of 12. He debuted in rallying in 1978 and competed in his first World Rally Championship event at the 1979 1000 Lakes Rally in Finland, finishing 14th in a Ford Escort RS2000. Kankkunen was coached by Timo Mäkinen, a friend of his father's, and was able to compete often and gain experience with financial help from Timo Jouhki, future manager for many Finnish rally drivers such as Tommi Mäkinen and Mikko Hirvonen.

1983–85: Toyota
Due to good results for Toyota Finland in local events, Kankkunen was signed by the Toyota Team Europe, Toyota's factory WRC team headed by Ove Andersson. In his first season in the Toyota Celica Twincam Turbo, as teammate to the 1979 world champion Björn Waldegård, his three outings in the championship resulted in a sixth place at the 1000 Lakes, a seventh place at the RAC Rally in Great Britain and a retirement at the Rallye Côte d'Ivoire. The following year, Kankkunen competed in four WRC events with Fred Gallagher as his new regular co-driver, retiring in three and finishing fifth in his home event. In 1985, he started his season with a surprise victory at the Safari Rally, becoming the first driver to win the event on the first attempt. He went on to compete in four more rallies and take his second win at WRC's second endurance event, the Rallye Côte d'Ivoire, where he finished with the same amount of penalty minutes (4 hours and 46 minutes) as his teammate Waldegård but took the win by a tiebreaker.

1986: Peugeot

Kankkunen's performances with the Celica earned him his chance to come to the fore with the defending manufacturers' and drivers' champions Peugeot. The team signed him for the 1986 season to replace Ari Vatanen who was still recovering from his nearly fatal accident during the previous season. Kankkunen duly seized his opportunity, taking the second evolution of the Peugeot 205 Turbo 16 E2 to victory in the Swedish Rally, the Acropolis Rally and the Rally New Zealand and finishing on the podium in three more events. The season ended in controversy, when first Group B cars were banned for the next season after Henri Toivonen's fatal accident at the Tour de Corse, which outraged Peugeot team principal Jean Todt, and later the French Peugeot team were excluded at the Rallye Sanremo in Italy, resulting in a triple win for home country's Lancia. Despite the 205 T16s passing the pre-rally scrutiny, the stewards had decreed on re-examination that the cars' underbody fins were in fact illegal side skirts. Going into the season-ending Olympus Rally in the United States, Lancia's Markku Alén led Kankkunen by one point. Although Alén beat Kankkunen to the win, he was the world champion only for eleven days, until Peugeot's appeal went through. The FIA deemed the team's Sanremo exclusion illegal and annulled the results of the event, making Kankkunen the youngest champion in the history of the series.

1987: Lancia
Following the FIA's decision to ban Group B, Peugeot withdrew from the WRC and Kankkunen moved to drive the Lancia Delta HF 4WD for Lancia Martini, Lancia's factory WRC team. He was quickly comfortable in the car and led his Lancia debut in Monte Carlo until the very last stage, when Lancia boss Cesare Fiorio controversially forced him to finish second behind teammate Miki Biasion. Kankkunen later won the Olympus Rally by beating Biasion by only 12 seconds in a six-hour event. In a close battle for the drivers' world championship title, he edged out his teammates Biasion and Alén by winning the season-ending RAC Rally. At the Autosport Awards, Kankkunen was presented the "International Rally Driver Award" for the second year running. Despite becoming the first driver to successfully defend the world title, Kankkunen's uneasy acceptance of team orders designed to benefit Biasion, the Italian star in an Italian car, pre-empted a move elsewhere for the 1988 season.

1988–89: Toyota
Kankkunen chose to move back to Toyota Team Europe. Although he finished fifth in his first event with the Toyota Supra Turbo at the Safari Rally, his title defense quickly proved unsuccessful. Toyota debuted the new Toyota Celica GT-Four ST165 at the Tour de Corse, but the car was suffering from reliability issues. Kankkunen retired due to engine problems in three consecutive rallies and did not add to his points tally, finishing only 37th in the drivers' standings.

However, outside the World Rally Championship, he achieved much success. Returning to the wheel of a Peugeot 205 T16, he won the Dakar Rally on his first attempt after compatriot and teammate Ari Vatanen's 405 T16 was famously stolen while he was leading the event. Kankkunen also competed for Peugeot at the Pikes Peak International Hillclimb, finishing runner-up to again-teammate Vatanen, and at the first-ever Race of Champions, beating the 1985 world rally champion and former Peugeot teammate Timo Salonen in the final to become the first "Champion of Champions".

The 1989 season saw an improved Toyota. Kankkunen gave the GT-Four its first victory in the Rally Australia and finished third at the Tour de Corse and at the RAC. His results placed him third in the drivers' championship, behind Lancia drivers Biasion and Alex Fiorio. Toyota took career-best second place in the manufacturers' standings.

1990–92: Lancia

By the time Kankkunen took the long-awaited win for Toyota, he had already signed a deal to reacquaint himself with Lancia for the 1990 season. Halfway through the season, Kankkunen found himself only fourth in the championship and Toyota in the lead with their new star driver Carlos Sainz. Although Kankkunen later repeated his win in Australia and collected his fifth podium of the season in Sanremo, Sainz went on to take a dominant title. Kankkunen placed third in the drivers' world championship, between his teammates Didier Auriol and the defending world champion Biasion. Lancia edged out Toyota to take a record fourth manufacturers' title in a row.

In the 1991 season, Kankkunen won the Safari Rally, the Acropolis Rally, his home event 1000 Lakes Rally for the first time and the Rally Australia for the third year in a row. Before the season-ending RAC Rally, Toyota's Sainz led Kankkunen by one point in the championship. By winning the RAC ahead of Kenneth Eriksson and Sainz, Kankkunen became the first man to seal a third drivers' title since the World Rally Championship's 1973 inauguration. His 150 points during the season is still the record for most points in a single season. This was also the first time that two drivers took five wins during a WRC season. In the Race of Champions, Kankkunen became the second two-time winner after beating Auriol in the final.

In 1992, Kankkunen placed on the podium in each of the nine WRC events that he participated in, but took his only win at the Rally Portugal. The title fight again went down to the wire. Before the final rally, Sainz led Kankkunen by two points and Auriol, who had taken a record six wins during the season, by three points. Sainz's victory in the RAC ahead of Ari Vatanen and Kankkunen, combined with Auriol's retirement, confirmed the title in favour of the Spaniard.

1993–96: Toyota

After Lancia withdrew from the WRC after the 1992 season, Kankkunen rejoined Toyota to drive the Toyota Celica GT-Four ST185 with which Sainz had defeated him last year. Despite having to fare from mid-season with two substitute co-drivers after Juha Piironen suffered a brain hemorrhage, Kankkunen went on to take a record fourth drivers' title by winning five of his ten WRC events; the Safari Rally with Piironen, the Rally Argentina, the Rally Australia and the RAC Rally with his new co-driver Nicky Grist, and the 1000 Lakes Rally with Denis Giraudet due to Grist's pre-arrangement with Armin Schwarz. Kankkunen's win at the RAC marked his career 20th in the series, breaking compatriot Markku Alén's record for most wins. Kankkunen and his third-placed teammate Didier Auriol brought Toyota the manufacturers' crown, the first for a Japanese manufacturer. He also became only the second motorsportsman to be voted the Finnish Sportsman of the Year, after the 1982 F1 world champion Keke Rosberg.

In 1994, Kankkunen started well with a runner-up spot in Monte Carlo and a win in Portugal. In the Safari Rally, he crashed out from the lead after hitting a pothole made by rain at 180 km/h (112 mph). At the season's half-way point, Kankkunen and Subaru's Sainz tied the lead in the championship, but a few poor results soon dropped him out of the title fight; in Argentina and Sanremo, he suffered from mechanical problems and in Finland, he won the opening stage but lost 20 minutes on stage two after rolling his car. He climbed back into the points by finishing ninth. Finishing behind Auriol and Sainz in the overall standings, Kankkunen had to watch a teammate take the title for the only time in his career.

In 1995, with two more rallies to go, Kankkunen's consistent performances during the season had kept him in the lead of the championship seven points ahead of Subaru's Colin McRae. At the penultimate round, the Rally Catalunya, he was leading by almost a minute over Sainz and McRae and seemed to be heading towards his first WRC victory on tarmac, as well as closing in on his fifth title. However, a pacenote mistake by either him or his co-driver Grist resulted in a crash and a retirement. After the event, Toyota were found guilty of the implementation of illegal turbo restrictor bypasses on their ST205 cars. The team was given a 12-month ban by the FIA. Toyota drivers Kankkunen, Auriol and Armin Schwarz were also stripped of all points in the championships. FIA president Max Mosley stated that "there is no suggestion the drivers were aware of what was going on." In the following year (1996 which also happened to be the end of Nicky Grist's pairing with Kankkunen as a favor to replace Colin McRae's co-driver Derek Ringer from 1997 to 2002), Kankkunen competed for private Toyota teams in three events and finished fourth in Sweden, third in Indonesia and second in Finland.

1997–98: Ford

Halfway through the 1997 season, Kankkunen joined the Ford Motor Company factory team to replace a disappointing Armin Schwarz. Joining the M-Sport-run team too late to challenge for the title himself, Kankkunen's role was to support Ford and his teammate Carlos Sainz in their title fights. He started well by leading his second event with the team, the Acropolis Rally in Greece, until having to drop behind Sainz due to a team order. Kankkunen went on to finish only seconds behind Sainz also in Indonesia and New Zealand. In his home rally in Finland, he lost the win to the defending world champion, Mitsubishi's Tommi Mäkinen, by only seven seconds. This is still the narrowest winning margin in the history of the event. A fourth runner-up spot followed in the season-ending RAC Rally, now ahead of the Spaniard who had by then lost the title to Mäkinen.

Kankkunen stayed with Ford for the 1998 season with Belgian driver Bruno Thiry as his new teammate, after Sainz had opted to re-join Toyota. Ford was already moving resources into developing the new Ford Focus WRC and the team's last year with the Escort WRC was winless. Kankkunen drove the car on the podium on seven occasions, and both Ford and Kankkunen finished fourth in their respective championships. For the 1999 season, Ford signed the Subaru World Rally Team star Colin McRae and Kankkunen moved to replace him at Subaru.

1999–2000: Subaru
Kankkunen's first year with the Subaru World Rally Team and the Subaru Impreza WRC led to victories in Argentina and Finland. In Argentina, he took his first win in over five years, overtaking teammate Richard Burns on the last stage to win by a mere 2.4 seconds. Kankkunen was prepared to accept a team order in the form of a deliberate 10-second time penalty, but with the TV cameras filming, Subaru team principal David Richards stated that there would be no team orders. In his home event, Kankkunen beat Burns to what would be his final victory in the WRC. Despite a one-two for Subaru again at the season-ending RAC, Subaru lost the manufacturers' crown to Toyota by four points. For the third year in a row, Kankkunen placed fourth in the drivers' championship, while Mäkinen equalled Kankkunen's record of four titles. Kankkunen's 2000 season was a disappointment. His best result was second in the Safari Rally behind Burns. With only two other podium finishes to his name, Kankkunen placed eighth in the drivers' standings.

Later career

Subaru and Kankkunen did not reach a deal for 2001, and Kankkunen ended up competing in only one world rally during the season, the Rally Finland for the Hyundai factory team. He retired after his Accent WRC incurred several technical problems. For the 2002 season, Hyundai initially offered Kankkunen a full 14-event programme, which did not interest him, and the deal was modified to include only the nine gravel rallies. Despite a new evolution of the Accent WRC, Hyundai were unable to challenge the top teams: Peugeot, Ford and Subaru. Kankkunen's fifth place in the Rally New Zealand was the team's best result of the season. However, Kankkunen and the team's full-time drivers Freddy Loix and Armin Schwarz did narrowly give Hyundai its career-best fourth place in the manufacturers' world championship. Kankkunen retired from the WRC after the season.

Following his retirement, Kankkunen announced his intention to enter politics, echoing the career path of rallying compatriot Ari Vatanen. In 2004, he ran for the European Parliament as a candidate of the conservative National Coalition Party. While Vatanen was re-elected, Kankkunen's 17,815 votes were not enough to gain a seat. Kankkunen, a "Flying Finn" himself, was one of the shareholders in the now-bankrupt Flying Finn airline, the first low cost airline in Finland. The company's first airplane was named after him. Kankkunen, along with former NHL star Jari Kurri, has also been a shareholder in a company that builds luxury real estate in Ruka, Finland.

In early 2007, Kankkunen set a new world speed record on ice in his privately owned Bentley Continental GT on the frozen Gulf of Bothnia near Oulu, Finland. Previously the record was  held by a Bugatti EB110 Supersport. The Bentley was largely standard except a rollcage, some aerodynamic improvements and low-temperature fuel and calibration. Tires were from Nokian Tyres with spikes. Technical support was provided by Nokian and Bentley Motors. Kankkunen bettered the record to 330.695 km/h (205.48 mph) in 2011, driving an E85-powered Bentley Continental Supersports convertible. Bentley will release a limited edition of the Supersports to celebrate the achievement. The 100 models will be the most powerful road cars Bentley has ever produced.

It was announced on 23 July 2010 that Kankkunen would take part in the 2010 Rally Finland to mark the sixtieth jubilee of the event. He was joined by his long-time co-driver Juha Repo driving a Ford Focus RS WRC 08 for the Stobart M-Sport Ford Rally Team.  At just over 51 years old, Kankkunen finished an impressive 8th, beating many WRC regulars.

Personal life
Kankkunen currently lives in Monaco but also spends time on his family farm in Laukaa, which includes a large country house and hundreds of hectares of land. He has a large car collection, which includes six Ferraris such as the F40 and the 288 GTO, as well as all the four rally cars with which he won the world championship. Kankkunen and his wife Pirjo filed for divorce in 2008. They have two sons named Tino and Niko. Juha's father Pekka (1934–2013) and his brother Timo were also  former rally drivers.

WRC victories

Complete WRC results

References

External links

Juha Kankkunen Driving Academy
Kankkunen's profile at RallyBase
Kankkunen's profile at World Rally Archive

1959 births
Living people
Lancia people
People from Laukaa
Finnish rally drivers
World Rally Champions
World Rally Championship drivers
Off-road racing drivers
Dakar Rally drivers
Dakar Rally winning drivers
Finnish expatriates in Monaco
Sportspeople from Central Finland
Peugeot Sport drivers
Toyota Gazoo Racing drivers
Hyundai Motorsport drivers
Volkswagen Motorsport drivers
M-Sport drivers